Divales bipustulatus is a species of beetles belonging to the family Melyridae.

Description
Elytra show two humeral red patches. Body is glossy, deep black, covered with fine erect hairs. Antennae and legs are black.

Distribution
This species is present in France, Italy, Switzerland, Greece and North Africa.

Subspecies
 Divales bipustulatus bimaculatus (Rossi, 1792)
 Divales bipustulatus bipustulatus (Fabricius, 1781)
 Divales bipustulatus erithromelas (Küster, 1852)
 Divales bipustulatus nigromaculatus (Lucas, 1849)
 Divales bipustulatus quadrimaculatus (Baudi, 1873)
 Divales bipustulatus variegatus (Lucas, 1849)

References

 Biolib
 Fauna Europaea 

Melyridae
Beetles of Europe
Beetles described in 1781